Solange Tetero is a Rwandan politician who currently serves as General Director of Youth Empowerment in Rwanda Minister of Youth and Culture since 2020. From 2015 to 2020 she has been working for the Imbuto Foundation. She was awarded two times by the First Lady of Rwanda in Best Performing Girls in country (BPGs) in 2009 and 2011.

Education 
Tetero is currently pursuing a master's degree in public health at Suffolk University in the United Kingdom and holds a bachelor's degree in soil and environment management from the University of Rwanda. She holds certificates in farmer-led agricultural extension and agriculture digitalization from Japan and the Netherlands.

References 

21st-century Rwandan women politicians
21st-century Rwandan politicians
Living people
Year of birth missing (living people)